Guacamole Films is a film production company in Buenos Aires, Argentina.

The firm is known for producing award-winning films and has taken all of their films to film festivals around the world.  The company is one of the production companies that is helping fuel the "New Argentine Film" wave movement.

Filmography
 Historias Mínimas (2002)
 El Perro (2004)
 18-J (2004)
 El Camino de San Diego (2006)

Footnotes

Film production companies of Argentina
Companies based in Buenos Aires
Entertainment companies established in 2002
2002 establishments in Argentina